The 1995–96 FA Cup (known as The FA Cup sponsored by Littlewoods for sponsorship reasons) was the 115th staging of the FA Cup. The competition was won outright by Manchester United, who won the final through a goal from Eric Cantona five minutes from the end of the game. It gave Manchester United a league and cup double after they secured their third league title in four years. It was also United's third straight FA Cup Final. 

The tournament began with teams from non-league football competing in preliminary and qualifying rounds in order to make it to the competition proper. Details of the qualifying tournament and all the rounds through to the final are available at FA Cup archives. Teams from Divisions 1 to 3 entered at the first round, while Premiership teams entered in the third round.

The topscorer in the competition was Dave Powell of Gravesend and Northfleet, whom scored 9 goals.

Calendar

First round proper

Teams from the Football League Second and Third Division entered in this round plus four non-league teams were given byes to this round: Woking, Kidderminster Harriers, Altrincham and Enfield. The matches were played on 11 November 1995. There were ten replays, with two ties requiring a penalty shootout to settle them. Fulham's 7–0 victory over Swansea City was an FA Cup record margin of victory against a team from a higher division.

Second round proper

The second round of the competition featured the winners of the first round ties. The matches were played on 2 December 1995, with six replays and one penalty shootout required.

Third round proper

The third round of the season's FA Cup was scheduled for 6 January and marked the point at which the teams in the two highest divisions in the English league system, the Premier League and the Football League First Division (now known as the Football League Championship). There were fourteen replays, with only one of these games going to penalties to settle it.

Fourth round proper

The Fourth Round ties were played with the thirty-two winners of the previous round. The matches were originally scheduled for Saturday, 27 January, although only four matches were played that weekend, and only two of these matches resulted in a victory for one side. There were seven replays but no penalty shootouts.

Fifth round proper

The Fifth Round matches were scheduled for 17 February. There were five replays and one penalty shootout.

Sixth round

The four quarter-final ties were scheduled to be played on the weekend of 9 and 10 March 1996. There were two replays, between Liverpool and Leeds and Wimbledon & Chelsea. These were played on 20 March 1996.

This was a rare occurrence of all eight quarter-finals being from the top division.

Replays

Semi finals

The semi final ties were played at neutral venues on 31 March 1996. Manchester United and Liverpool beat Chelsea and Aston Villa respectively to reach the final. At this stage, Manchester United were top of the league and looking good bets for a unique second double two years after their first one, while Liverpool were hopeful of a similar triumph as they were third in the league and still in with a slim chance of a second double 10 years after their first one.

Just weeks before accepting the role as England manager, Glenn Hoddle watched his Chelsea side throw away their chances of major trophy late in the season for the third year running, one year after losing in the UEFA Cup Winners' Cup semi-finals and two years after losing the FA Cup final.

Aston Villa's defeat ended their hopes of emulating Arsenal's 1993 triumph of an FA Cup/League Cup double, as they had lifted the League Cup the previous weekend.

Referee:- Stephen Lodge (Barnsley)

Final

A late goal from Eric Cantona, United's top scorer and the FWA Player of the Year just a year after being vilified for the assault on a spectator which saw him banned from football for eight months, saw a United side featuring some of the Premier League's youngest players clinch a 1–0 win over Liverpool to become the first team to win the double twice, two years after their first double.

Media coverage
For the eighth consecutive season in the United Kingdom, the BBC were the free to air broadcasters while Sky Sports were the subscription broadcasters.

The matches shown live on the BBC were: Chelsea 1–1 Newcastle United (R3); Sheffield United 0–1 Aston Villa (R4); Manchester United 2–1 Manchester City (R5); Leeds United 0–0 Liverpool (QF); Manchester United 2–1 Chelsea (SF) and Manchester United 1–0 Liverpool (Final).

External links
FA Cup at BBC Sport
FA website

 
FA Cup seasons
Fa Cup, 1995-96
1995–96 in English football